May Britt Vihovde (born 15 September 1958 in Sveio) is a Norwegian politician for the Liberal Party.

She was elected to the Norwegian Parliament from Hordaland in 1997, but was not re-elected in 2001. She served in the position of deputy representative during the terms 1993–1997, 2001–2005 and 2005–2009, but during the entire second term as deputy she sat as a regular representative, replacing Lars Sponheim who was appointed to the second cabinet Bondevik.

Vihovde was a member of the executive committee of Sveio municipality council in the periods 1987–1991 and 1995–1997.

References

1958 births
Living people
Liberal Party (Norway) politicians
Members of the Storting
Women members of the Storting
21st-century Norwegian politicians
21st-century Norwegian women politicians
20th-century Norwegian politicians
20th-century Norwegian women politicians
People from Sveio